Vietnam music, Vietnamese music, Vietnam songs or Vietnamese songs may refer to the following:

Vietnam War 

 List of songs about the Vietnam War, songs depicting life and political system during the war
 Fortunate Son, famous American anti-war song during the war
 Songs and poetry of Soviet servicemen deployed to Vietnam
 Vietnam War Song Project, private organization that archives and analyze Vietnamese War songs

Culture 

 Music of Vietnam
 Traditional Vietnamese musical instruments
 Sing My Song Vietnam